Make Mine a Mystery: A Reader's Guide to Mystery and Detective Fiction is a book written by Gary Warren Niebuhr and published by Libraries Unlimited (owned and operated by ABC-CLIO) on 30 April 2003, which later went on to win the Anthony Award for Best Critical Nonfiction in 2004.

References 

Anthony Award-winning works
Non-fiction crime books
American non-fiction books
2003 non-fiction books